Cylindracanthus is an extinct genus of Cretaceous to Eocene ray-finned fish.

See also

 Prehistoric fish
 List of prehistoric bony fish

External links
 Bony fish in the online Sepkoski Database
 Cylindracanthus at fossilworks

Prehistoric ray-finned fish genera
Cretaceous bony fish
Late Cretaceous fish
Paleocene fish
Eocene fish
Acanthomorpha
Prehistoric fish of Asia
Prehistoric fish of Europe
Taxa named by Joseph Leidy
Fossil taxa described in 1856